Robert J. Blakiston (October 2, 1855 – December 25, 1918), was a Major League Baseball outfielder. He played three seasons in the majors, from -, for the Philadelphia Athletics and Indianapolis Hoosiers.

External links

1855 births
1918 deaths
Major League Baseball outfielders
Philadelphia Athletics (AA) players
Indianapolis Hoosiers (AA) players
Baseball players from San Francisco
19th-century baseball players
San Francisco Californias players
San Francisco Athletics players
Newark Domestics players
Chattanooga Lookouts players
Binghamton Crickets (1880s) players
Rochester Maroons players
Stockton (minor league baseball) players